The 25th Connecticut Infantry Regiment was an infantry regiment that served in the Union Army during the American Civil War for nine months service.

Service
The 25th Connecticut Infantry Regiment was organized at Hartford, Connecticut, on November 11, 1862, under the command of Colonel George P. Bissell.

The regiment was attached to Grover's Division, Department of the Gulf, to January 1863. 3rd Brigade, 4th Division, XIX Corps, Department of the Gulf, to August 1863.

The 25th Connecticut Infantry mustered out of service August 26, 1863.

Detailed service
Left Connecticut for eastern New York November 14, then sailed for New Orleans and Baton Rouge, La., November 29, arriving there December 17. Duty at Baton Rouge until March 1863. Operations against Port Hudson March 7–27. Moved to Donaldsonville March 28. Operations in western Louisiana April 9-May 14. Bayou Teche Campaign April 11–20. Porter's and McWilliams' Plantation at Indian Bend April 13. Irish Bend April 14. Bayou Vermillion April 17. Expedition to Alexandria and Simsport May 5–18. Moved to Bayou Sara, then to Port Hudson May 22–25. Siege of Port Hudson May 25-July 9. Assaults on Port Hudson May 27 and June 14. Surrender of Port Hudson July 9. Moved to Donaldsonville July 11. Duty in Plaquemine District until August.

Casualties
The regiment lost a total of 94 men during service; 3 officers and 26 enlisted men killed or mortally wounded, 4 officers and 61 enlisted men died of disease.

Commanders
 Colonel George P. Bissell
 Lieutenant Colonel Mason C. Weld - commanded during the siege of Port Hudson

Notable members
 2nd Lieutenant William Edgar Simonds, Company I - Medal of Honor recipient for action at the Battle of Irish Bend; U.S. Representative from Connecticut (1889-1891) [Simonds was sergeant major at the time of the battle and promoted 10 days later]

See also

 Connecticut in the American Civil War
 List of Connecticut Civil War units

References
 Dyer, Frederick H. A Compendium of the War of the Rebellion (Des Moines, IA:  Dyer Pub. Co.), 1908.
 Bissell, George P. The Twenty-Fifth Regiment Connecticut Volunteers in the War of the Rebellion: History, Reminiscences, Description of Battle of Irish Bend, Carrying of Pay Roll, Roster (Rockville, CT: Rockville Journal), 1913.
 McManus, Thomas. Battle of Irish Bend: Interesting Reminiscences of That Terrible Combat / An Address Given Before the People of St. Patrick's Church, Collinsville, April 23, 1891 (S.l.:  s.n.), 1891.
 McManus, Thomas. Battle Fields of Louisiana Revisited a Second Time (Hartford, CT: The Fowler & Miller Co.), 1898.
 McManus, Thomas. Through the Campaigning Grounds of Louisiana (S.l.: s.n.), 1907.
 McManus, Thomas. Twenty-Fifth Regiment: Battle Fields Revisited (Hartford, CT: Clark & Smith), 1896.

Attribution
 

Military units and formations established in 1862
Military units and formations disestablished in 1863
Units and formations of the Union Army from Connecticut
1862 establishments in Connecticut